Lesbia Brandon is an erotic novel written by Algernon Charles Swinburne between 1859 and 1868, but suppressed because it was considered pornographic in its day. It was originally illustrated by Simeon Solomon.

Titled and published
Never completed or even given a title by its author, the novel gained one from T. J. Wise. It eventually appeared in print for the first time in 1952, published by British Book Center and edited by Randolph Hughes.

References

Notes

George Haggerty and Bonnie Zimmerman, Encyclopedia of Lesbian and Gay Histories and Cultures, Volume 1, Taylor & Francis, 2000, p. 263
Jeremy Mitchell, "Swinburne – The Disappointed Protagonist", Yale French Studies, No. 35, The House of Sade (1965), pp. 81–88 
Yopie Prins, Victorian Sappho, Princeton University Press, 1999, pp. 123–125
Arthur Symons, Dramatis personae, Ayer Publishing, 1971, p. 251
John Vincent, "Flogging is fundamental: applications of birch in Swinburne's Lesbia Brandon", Novel gazing: queer readings in fiction, ed. Eve Kosofsky Sedgwick, Duke University Press, 1997, pp. 269–298

British pornography
1868 British novels
1952 British novels
Works by Algernon Charles Swinburne